Qaleh-ye Harasam (also Romanized as Qal‘eh-ye Harasam and Qal‘eh Harasam; also known as Harasam) is a village in Harasam Rural District, Homeyl District, Eslamabad-e Gharb County, Kermanshah Province, Iran. At the 2006 census, its population was 698, in 152 families.

References 

Populated places in Eslamabad-e Gharb County